Derbyshire County Cricket Club in 1935 was the cricket season when the English club Derbyshire were runners up in the County Championship for the first time, as a prelude to winning the Championship in the 1936 season. They had been playing for sixty four years and it was their thirty-seventh season in the County Championship.

1935 season

A. W. Richardson became captain in the 1931 season, and building on foundations of his predecessors forged a team that were runners up in 1935 before going on to take the Championship in the 1936 season. Their record was in fact better in 1935 than in their championship year.

Derbyshire played 28 games in the County Championship, and one match against the touring South Africans.
Denis Smith was top scorer in the County Championships. Tommy Mitchell took 160 wickets in the championship and a further eight to make him top bowler and set a lasting record of most wickets in a season. Against Leicestershire in 1935 he took all ten for 64 in an innings.

Denis Smith also played for England in two Test matches against the South Africans and was Wisden Cricketer of the Year..

Gilbert Hodgkinson, future captain made his debut in the season.

Matches

{| class="wikitable" style="width:100%;"
|-
! style="background:#efefef;" colspan="6"| List of  matches
|- style="background:#efefef;"
!No.
!Date
!V
!Result 
!Margin
!Notes
|-
|1
| 11 May 1935 
| Yorkshire Queen's Park, Chesterfield 
| style="background:#fc0;"|Drawn
|
| D Smith 189; A E Alderman 100; Hedley Verity 5-118 and 5-74  
|-
|2
|15 May 1935   
| Surrey  Kennington Oval 
| style="background:#0f0;"|Won 
|9 wickets
| T. B. Mitchell 8-78  
|-
|3
|18 May 1935 
| Leicestershire County Ground, Derby  
| style="background:#0f0;"|Won 
|10 wickets
| W H Copson  5-37   
|-
|4
|25 May 1935 
| Essex Old County Ground, Brentwood  
| style="background:#0f0;"|Won 
|4 wickets
| W H Copson  5-28; T. B. Mitchell 5-56; Eastman 5-36 and 6-60   
|-
|5
|29 May 1935 
|South AfricansRutland Recreation Ground, Ilkeston  
| style="background:#f00;"|Lost 
|209 runs
|Viljoen 153; Cameron 132; T. B. Mitchell 5-167   
|-
|6
|01 Jun 1935 
| Hampshire Queen's Park, Chesterfield 
| style="background:#0f0;"|Won 
|Innings and 104 runs
| D Smith 225   
|-
|7
|05 Jun 1935 
| Worcestershire   County Ground, New Road, Worcester  
| style="background:#f00;"|Lost 
|9 wickets
| Howorth 6-16   
|-
|8
|08 Jun 1935 
| Warwickshire  Edgbaston, Birmingham 
| style="background:#f00;"|Lost 
|6 wickets
| Wyatt 5-30  
|-
|9
|15 Jun 1935 
| Leicestershire Aylestone Road, Leicester  
| style="background:#fc0;"|Drawn
|
| H Smith 5-51; Geary 5-46; T. B. Mitchell 10-64; Marlow 5-69  
|-
|10
|19 Jun 1935 
| Somerset  County Ground, Derby  
| style="background:#0f0;"|Won 
|114 runs
| W H Copson  5-15; Derbyshire played one ball in their second innings before declaring  
|-
|11
|26 Jun 1935 
|Lancashire  Old Trafford, Manchester   
| style="background:#0f0;"|Won 
|7 runs
| Booth 5-54  
|-
|12
|29 Jun 1935 
|  Nottinghamshire Rutland Recreation Ground, Ilkeston  
| style="background:#0f0;"|Won 
|7 wickets
| T S Worthington 126; Voce 5-87  
|-
|13
|03 Jul 1935 
| Surrey   Queen's Park, Chesterfield  
| style="background:#fc0;"|Drawn
|
| Holmes 206; T S Worthington 107; Watts 6-74; A V Pope 5-34   
|-
|14
|06 Jul 1935
|  Lancashire   Park Road Ground, Buxton  
| style="background:#fc0;"|Drawn
|
| T R Armstrong 5-13; L F Townsend 5-35   
|-
|15
|10 Jul 1935 
| Gloucestershire  Ashley Down Ground, Bristol  
| style="background:#f00;"|Lost 
|68 runs
| T. B. Mitchell 6-126; Goddard 6-62; A V Pope 5-48  
|-
|16
|13 Jul 1935 
|  Nottinghamshire Trent Bridge, Nottingham  
| style="background:#f00;"|Lost 
|3 wickets
| Gunn 113  
|-
|17
|17 Jul 1935 
| Kent   Queen's Park, Chesterfield  
| style="background:#0f0;"|Won 
|Innings and 75 runs
| A V Pope 5-37; Todd 6-94; T. B. Mitchell 7-66   
|-
|18
|20 Jul 1935 
| Gloucestershire The Town Ground, Burton-on-Trent  
| style="background:#0f0;"|Won 
|10 wickets
| W H Copson  5-31  
|-
|19
|24 Jul 1935 
|  Sussex   Queen's Park, Chesterfield  
| style="background:#f00;"|Lost 
|7 wickets
| Parks 119   
|-
|20
|27 Jul 1935 
|  Northamptonshire  Queen's Park, Chesterfield   
| style="background:#0f0;"|Won 
|10 wickets
| T. B. Mitchell 8-67; L F Townsend 5-21  
|-
|21
|31 Jul 1935 
|  Sussex    County Ground, Hove  
| style="background:#0f0;"|Won 
|5 wickets
| Langridge 106; Cornford 7-76; W H Copson  6-42   
|-
|22
|03 Aug 1935 
|  Warwickshire  County Ground, Derby  
| style="background:#0f0;"|Won 
|77 runs
| L F Townsend 103; Santall 113; Hollies 6-75; T. B. Mitchell 5-63  
|-
|23
|07 Aug 1935 
| Northamptonshire  County Ground, Northampton 
| style="background:#0f0;"|Won 
|100 runs
|L F Townsend 102; Clark 5-33; T. B. Mitchell 7-73; W H Copson  5-44   
|-
|24
|10 Aug 1935 
| Essex   Queen's Park, Chesterfield  
| style="background:#0f0;"|Won 
|21 runs
| T. B. Mitchell 7-97; Nichols 8-58  
|-
|25
|14 Aug 1935 
| Yorkshire   North Marine Road Ground, Scarborough  
| style="background:#f00;"|Lost 
|10 wickets
|   
|-
|26
|17 Aug 1935 
| Worcestershire    County Ground, Derby  
| style="background:#fc0;"|Drawn
|
| L F Townsend 180  
|-
|27
|21 Aug 1935 
| Kent   Crabble Athletic Ground, Dover  
| style="background:#fc0;"|Drawn
|
| G H Pope 5-126   
|-
|28
|24 Aug 1935 
| Hampshire Dean Park, Bournemouth  
| style="background:#0f0;"|Won 
|80 runs
| A V Pope 5-35 and 5-41  
|-
|29
|28 Aug 1935 
| Somerset  County Ground, Taunton  
| style="background:#0f0;"|Won 
|41 runs
| T. B. Mitchell 5-58; White 8-36  
|-

Statistics

County Championship batting averages

In addition Thomas Higson played in the match against the South Africans.

County Championship bowling averages

Wicket Keeper

H Elliott Catches 66  Stumping 22

See also
Derbyshire County Cricket Club seasons
1935 English cricket season

References

1935 in English cricket
Derbyshire County Cricket Club seasons
English cricket seasons in the 20th century